The year 1639 in science and technology involved some significant events.

Astronomy
 Giovanni Battista Zupi observes that the planet Mercury has orbital phases.
 December 4 (November 24 in Julian calendar) – English astronomers Jeremiah Horrocks and William Crabtree are the first and only scientific observers of a transit of Venus, predicted by Horrocks.

Exploration
 The Casiquiare canal, a river forming a natural canal between the Amazon River and Orinoco River basins, is first encountered by Europeans

Mathematics
 Girard Desargues introduces the concept of infinity into geometry.

Births
 April 12 – Martin Lister, English naturalist and physician (died 1712)
 December 18 – Gottfried Kirch, German astronomer (died 1710)
 approx. date – Daniel Greysolon, Sieur du Lhut, French explorer (died 1710)

Deaths
 June 6 – Peter Crüger, German polymath (born 1580)
 August 7 – Martin van den Hove, Dutch astronomer (born 1605)
 Mutio Oddi, Italian mathematician (born 1569)

References

 
17th century in science
1630s in science